Subhash Shinde is a makeup designer and celebrity makeup artist in India. Subhash started his career at the age of 18, as an assistant makeup man on the movie “Dilwale Dulhanya Le Jayenge”.

He has worked on many Bollywood films, such as Mary Kom, Sarbjit, Goliyon Ki Raasleela Ram-Leela, Mom, Bhoomi, Haseena Parkar, and many more. He has also done commercials. He is the first makeup artist in India to do glamour and prosthetics. He is active in conducting workshops and seminars on prosthetics and glamour makeup for young budding makeup artists. Recently, he launched the Subhash Shinde International Academy of Makeup and Hairstyling in India. He usually does makeup for women. Subhash Shinde is known as the "prosthetics king", as it is not commonly used among Indian makeup artists.

Make-Up filmography

References

Indian make-up artists